Geoffrey Dyer (1947 – 7 October 2020) was an Australian artist. He was born and died in Hobart, Tasmania.

Career
He won the Archibald Prize in 2003 with a portrait of Richard Flanagan.

He was a finalist of the 2011 Archibald Prize.

Steven Joyce of Hobart's Despard Gallery announced Dyer's death via social media on Thursday 8 October 2020 at age 73.

References

Artists from Tasmania
Australian painters
Archibald Prize winners
2020 deaths
1947 births
People from Hobart
Australian portrait painters
Australian contemporary artists